Křemže is a market town in Český Krumlov District in the South Bohemian Region of the Czech Republic. It has about 2,900 inhabitants.

Administrative parts
Villages of Bohouškovice, Chlum, Chlumeček, Chmelná, Lhotka, Loučej, Mříč, Stupná and Vinná are administrative parts of Křemže.

Geography
It lies in the Bohemian Forest Foothills, in the Blanský les Protected Landscape Area. Its summit is located on the southern border of Křemže. There are several ponds in the municipal territory.

History
The first written mention of Křemže is from 1263. Until 1444, the village was owned by the Dubenský of Chlum family, then it was acquired by Oldřich II of Rosenberg. He sold it back to the Dubenský of Chlum family in 1451. In 1547, Křemže was inherited by the Častolár family. From 1678 until its abolishment in 1785, the village was property of the monastery in Zlatá Koruna, then it was merged with the Český Krumlov estate. In 1863, Křemže was promoted to a town.

Sights
The main landmark of Křemže is the Church of Saint Michael the Archangel. It was probably built at the end of the 13th century. Pseudo-Gothic reconstruction took place in 1885–1887. The rectory next to the church dates from 1840 and was built after the old rectory was destroyed by fire.

The oldest stone observation tower in the Czech Republic was built on Kleť in 1825. It was built by Count Josef Schwarzenberg. It used to be a trigonometric point for cartographic works. In 1925, a mountain hut was built on Kleť for tourists. It contains sundial, the highest in the Czech Republic.

References

External links

Populated places in Český Krumlov District
Market towns in the Czech Republic